Michael Curtis may refer to:

Michael Curtis (journalist) (1920–2004), British newspaper editor and executive
Michael Curtis (musician), musician and composer
Michael Curtis (role playing game writer), role-playing game designer and writer
Michael Curtis (soccer) (born 1975), American soccer player and coach
Michael Curtis (TV producer), television producer and writer
Mike Curtis (American football) (1943–2020), American football linebacker
Mike Curtis (cricketer), New Zealand cricketer
Mike Curtis (politician), American politician
Mike Curtis (writer) (born 1953), American writer who scripts the Dick Tracy comic strip
Mickey Curtis (born 1938), Japanese actor

See also
Michael Curtiz (1886–1962), Academy Award-winning Hungarian-American film director